Orphans of the Sky is a science fiction novel by American writer Robert A. Heinlein, consisting of two parts: "Universe" (Astounding Science Fiction, May 1941) and its sequel, "Common Sense" (Astounding Science Fiction, October 1941). The two novellas were first published together in book form in 1963. "Universe" was also published separately in 1951 as a 10¢ Dell paperback. The work presents one of the earliest fictional depictions of a generation ship.

Plot
The gigantic, cylindrical generation ship Vanguard, originally destined for "Far Centaurus", is cruising without guidance through the interstellar medium because long ago, a mutiny killed most of the officers. Over time, the descendants of the surviving loyal crew have lapsed into a pre-technological culture that is marked by superstition, and have forgotten the purpose and nature of their ship. Since they come to believe the "Ship" is the entire universe, "To move the ship" is considered an oxymoron, and references to the Ship's "voyage" are interpreted as religious metaphor. They are ruled by an oligarchy of "officers" and "scientists." Most crew members are simple illiterate farmers, seldom or never venturing to the "upper decks," where the "muties" (an abbreviation of "mutants" or "mutineers") dwell. Among the crew, all identifiable mutants are killed at birth.

The story centers on a young man of insatiable curiosity, Hugh Hoyland, who is selected as an apprentice by a scientist. The scientists ritualistically perform the tasks required to maintain the Ship, such as putting trash into its energy converter to generate power, and remain ignorant of their true functions.

On a hunt for muties, Hugh is captured by them. He barely avoids getting eaten by the microcephalic dwarf Bobo and instead becomes the slave of Joe-Jim Gregory, the two-headed leader of a powerful mutie gang. Joe and Jim have separate identities, but both are highly intelligent and have come to a crude understanding of the Ship's true nature.

Having become convinced of the Ship's true purpose, Hugh persuades Joe-Jim to complete the mission of colonization since he notices that there is a nearby star that Joe-Jim has observed growing larger over the years. Intent on the mission, he returns to the lower levels of the Ship to convince others to help him, but is arrested by his former boss, Bill Ertz, and sentenced to death. He is viewed as either insane or a previously unrecognized mutant; he was a borderline case at birth, with a head viewed as too large.

Hugh persuades an old friend, Alan Mahoney, to enlist Joe-Jim's gang in rescuing him. He shows the captured Bill and Alan the long-abandoned command center and a view of the stars. Convinced, Bill then enlists the captain's aide, Phineas Narby, to Hugh's crusade.

Inspired by one of Joe-Jim's favorite books, The Three Musketeers, they manufacture swords superior to the daggers that everyone else has. They overthrow the captain, install Narby in his place, and embark on a campaign to bring the entire Ship under their control.

However, Narby never believed Hugh and played along only to gain power. Once in control, he sets out to eliminate the muties. Joe is killed in the fighting, but Jim sacrifices himself to hold off their pursuers long enough for Hugh, Bill, Alan, and their wives to get to a highly automated lifeboat. Hugh manages to land on the habitable moon of a gas giant. The colonists disembark and uneasily explore their alien surroundings.

Reception
Avram Davidson described Orphans of the Sky as "a modern classic" and praised "the magnitude and magnificence of Orphans concepts" but expressed disappointment in "the limitations of its conclusion." Damon Knight said, "Nobody has ever improved on Universe, although a good many reckless people have tried, because Heinlein said it all." Algis Budrys said, "Many hands have worked at improving Heinlein's impeccable statement of this theme", with none succeeding until James White's The Watch Below.

Links to other Heinlein stories

A paragraph at the start of the novel shows an excerpt from "The Romance of Modern Astrography," explaining that the ship was part of the "Proxima Centauri Expedition, sponsored by the Jordan Foundation in 2119"  (A timeline produced by Heinlein to link different stories in his Future History places the launch of the Vanguard in the early 22nd century.) A discovered ship's log begins in June 2172, a few days before the mutiny breaks out.

In Heinlein's later novel Time Enough for Love, the Vanguard is briefly mentioned as the sister ship of New Frontiers, which was commandeered by the Howard Families in the novel Methuselah's Children. It is revealed that the vessel had been bound for Proxima Centauri but never landed colonists there. The Vanguard has been discovered, with its crew long dead because of an unexplained failure in its mechanisms, and its records destroyed or illegible. Its path is traced back, and the descendants of Hugh's people are found, flourishing as highly intelligent savages on a planet which scientists dub "Pitcairn Island". Another reference to Heinlein's Future History is a passage describing Joe-Jim's enthusiasm for the works of "Rhysling, the blind singer of the spaceways," a poet and the central character of the Heinlein story "The Green Hills of Earth".

Radio adaptation

"Universe" was also performed as a radio play on the NBC Radio Network programs Dimension X (on November 26, 1951) and X Minus One (on May 15, 1955).  Those versions have several drastic changes to the story, especially in their conclusions in which Hugh is killed, showing the crew of the Vanguard the true nature of the Ship.

Scientific basis

Two-headed humans exist, one variation of conjoined twins.

The physics of the Ship's artificial gravity is also correct: it spins to simulate gravity, which is absent at the centre. The ship's "Converter" reflects an early 1940s viewpoint of atomic power, with atoms of any element "ripped apart" in an unspecified manner.

The notion of a giant planet with a habitable moon went against theories of planetary formation as they stood before the discovery of "hot Jupiter" planets. It was thought that planets large enough to have an Earth-sized moon would form only above the "snowline," too far from the star for life. It is now believed that such worlds can migrate inwards, and habitable moons seem likely. The existence of exomoons has not been confirmed, but there are candidates.

Influence
The idea of a generation ship goes back at least to the 1920s, but Heinlein popularised it.   It has been used extensively since then, along with other ideas such as passengers in deep sleep and an automated craft carrying frozen embryos.

See also 
Non-Stop, by Brian W. Aldiss (titled Starship in its US release)
Captive Universe, by Harry Harrison
"Proxima Centauri", by Murray Leinster
"The Oceans are Wide", a story by Frank M. Robinson about a generation ship whose inhabitants have not forgotten its purpose
The Book of the Long Sun, by Gene Wolfe
"For the World Is Hollow and I Have Touched the Sky", an episode of the original Star Trek with a similar premise
"Mission of the Darians", an episode of Space: 1999 with a similar premise
The Starlost, a Canadian-produced science fiction television series devised by writer Harlan Ellison and broadcast in 1973
Marrow, a novel by American author Robert Reed published in 2000.
Pandorum, a 2009 German-British science fiction film
"If the Stars Should Appear", an episode of science fiction television series The Orville written by Seth MacFarlane and broadcast on September 28, 2017
Metamorphosis Alpha, a role-playing game by James Ward

References

External links 

"Universe" and "Common Sense" on the Internet Archive

1941 American novels
1941 science fiction novels
American science fiction novels
Fiction about gas giants
Generation ships in fiction
Novels by Robert A. Heinlein
Novels first published in serial form
Fiction set around Proxima Centauri
Works originally published in Analog Science Fiction and Fact
Works set on fictional moons
Fiction set in the 22nd century